Şu Gelen Atlımıdır (Georgiana Sharki)(Damdan Düştüm Dalgalanıyorum)(I Fell off the Roof and I'm Wavering) is a  Turkish folkloric tune Çiftetelli or Kaşık Havası.

Original form
The original form of the Kasik Havasi was popular in Isparta or Konya .

See also 
Tsifteteli
Vahan Boyajian

References 

Turkish music
Turkish songs